Elasmucha is a genus of shield bugs belonging to the family Acanthosomatidae.

Species
 Elasmucha cordillera Thomas, 1991 
 Elasmucha ferrugata (Fabricius, 1787) 
 Elasmucha fieberi (Jakovlev, 1864) 
 Elasmucha flammatum (Distant, 1893) 
 Elasmucha grisea (Linnaeus, 1758) - Parent Shieldbug 
 Elasmucha lateralis (Say, 1831)

References

Acanthosomatidae
Heteroptera genera